Darcy Sharpe (born 9 February 1996 in Calgary, Alberta) is a Canadian snowboarder. He is the brother of Douglas Sharpe and Cassie Sharpe. 

He won a silver medal in men's big air at the FIS Freestyle Ski and Snowboarding World Championships 2015. He won a gold medal in slopestyle at the 2020 Aspen X Games.

In January 2022, Sharpe was named to Canada's 2022 Olympic team.

References

External links

Canadian male snowboarders
1996 births
Living people
Place of birth missing (living people)
X Games athletes
Snowboarders at the 2022 Winter Olympics
Olympic snowboarders of Canada